Jiří Dolana (March 16, 1937 in Hradec Králové, Czechoslovakia – July 14, 2003) was an ice hockey player who played for the Czechoslovak national team. He won a bronze medal at the 1964 Winter Olympics.

References

External links

1937 births
2003 deaths
Ice hockey players at the 1964 Winter Olympics
HC Dukla Jihlava players
HC Dynamo Pardubice players
Olympic bronze medalists for Czechoslovakia
Olympic ice hockey players of Czechoslovakia
Olympic medalists in ice hockey
Medalists at the 1964 Winter Olympics
Sportspeople from Hradec Králové
Czechoslovak expatriate sportspeople in Italy
Czechoslovak expatriate ice hockey people
Expatriate ice hockey players in Italy
Czech ice hockey right wingers
Czechoslovak ice hockey right wingers
Bolzano HC players